The 1989–90 Illinois Fighting Illini men's basketball team represented the University of Illinois.

Regular season
Coming off the Final Four season a year earlier, Illinois went 21-8 overall, 11-7 in the Big Ten in 1990. Kendall Gill, a senior, became the first player since Ken Norman in 1987 to average 20 points per game.  Gill was named a First-Team All-American by UPI. Gill led the Big Ten in scoring and was a finalist for the John Wooden Player of the Year Award. He was the fifth overall pick in the NBA draft, going to the Charlotte Hornets.

Roster

Source

Schedule
												
Source																
												

|-
!colspan=12 style="background:#DF4E38; color:white;"| Non-Conference regular season

	

|-
!colspan=9 style="background:#DF4E38; color:#FFFFFF;"|Big Ten regular season

|-
!colspan=9 style="text-align: center; background:#DF4E38"|NCAA tournament

|-

Player stats

Awards and honors
Kendall Gill
Consensus 2nd team All-American
United Press International 1st team All-American
Associated Press 3rd team All-American
National Association of Basketball Coaches 3rd team All-American
Team Most Valuable Player 
Fighting Illini All-Century team (2005)
Deon Thomas
Fighting Illini All-Century team (2005)

NCAA basketball tournament
Midwest
 Dayton 88, Illinois 86

Team players drafted into the NBA

Rankings

References

Illinois Fighting Illini
Illinois Fighting Illini men's basketball seasons
Illinois
1989 in sports in Illinois
Brad